Juan Carlos Stauskas (born 6 August 1939) is an Argentine former footballer who competed in the 1960 Summer Olympics.

References

1939 births
Living people
Footballers from Buenos Aires
Association football defenders
Argentine footballers
Olympic footballers of Argentina
Footballers at the 1960 Summer Olympics
Club Atlético River Plate footballers